The 1948 Ball State Cardinals football team was an American football team that represented Ball State Teachers College (later renamed Ball State University) as an independent during the 1948 college football season. In their 13th season under head coach John Magnabosco, the Cardinals compiled a 6–2 record and outscored opponents by a total of 155 to 73.

Schedule

References

Ball State
Ball State Cardinals football seasons
Ball State Cardinals football